Peritelinus is a genus of broad-nosed weevils in the family Curculionidae. There are at least 3 described species in Peritelinus.

Species
 Peritelinus erinaceus Van Dyke, 1936
 Peritelinus oregonus Van Dyke, 1936
 Peritelinus variegatus Casey, 1888

References

 Alonso-Zarazaga, Miguel A., and Christopher H. C. Lyal (1999). A World Catalogue of Families and Genera of Curculionoidea (Insecta: Coleoptera) (Excepting Scotylidae and Platypodidae), 315.
 Poole, Robert W., and Patricia Gentili, eds. (1996). "Coleoptera". Nomina Insecta Nearctica: A Check List of the Insects of North America, vol. 1: Coleoptera, Strepsiptera, 41-820.

Further reading

 Arnett, R.H. Jr., M. C. Thomas, P. E. Skelley and J. H. Frank. (eds.). (2002). American Beetles, Volume II: Polyphaga: Scarabaeoidea through Curculionoidea. CRC Press LLC, Boca Raton, FL.
 
 Richard E. White. (1983). Peterson Field Guides: Beetles. Houghton Mifflin Company.

Entiminae